HD 34989 is a blue-white star in the main sequence, of apparent magnitude 5.80, in the constellation of Orion. It is 1700 light-years from the Solar System.

Observation 
The star is in the northern celestial hemisphere, but close to the celestial equator; this means that it can be observed from all the inhabited regions of the Earth without difficulty and that it is not visible only in the innermost areas of Antarctica. It appears as circumpolar only far beyond the Arctic polar circle. Its brightness puts it at the limit of visibility to the naked eye, so to be observed without the aid of devices requires a clear, and preferably moonless, sky.

The best period for observation in the evening sky is between late October and April from both hemispheres; in February (as at J2000) it is anti-posed from the Sun. In July and August its direction is close to that of the Sun, therefore coinciding with most hours of daylight.

Physical characteristics 
It is a blue-white star of the main sequence, having an absolute magnitude of -0.99 and its positive radial velocity indicates that the star is moving away from the Solar System.

The star appears wrapped in an extensive nebulosity that partly shines by reflection and partly by emission. The reflection nebula is listed as GN 05.19.0 and the HII region is called Sh2-263. HD 34989 is the ionizing source of this HII-region. In observations with carbon monoxide this corresponds to a circular hole.

The star has a size of about 0.118 ± 0.026 milliarcseconds, based on SED fitting.

References

B-type main-sequence stars
Orion (constellation)
025041
034989
1763
Durchmusterung objects